Myrmica microrubra is a species of ant that can be found in Austria, Bulgaria, Finland, France, Germany, Great Britain, Poland, Ukraine, and the Netherlands.

References

Myrmica
Insects described in 1993